Salvador Tafolla Godínez  (born 30 October 1993 in Tanhuato, Michoacán) is a Mexican professional footballer who plays in the forward position for Tiburones Rojos de Veracruz of Liga MX.

References

1993 births
Living people
Footballers from Michoacán
Mexican footballers
Association football forwards
C.D. Veracruz footballers
21st-century Mexican people